Nico Broeckaert (Zottegem, 23 November 1960) is a former Belgian footballer who played as central defender.

Honours 
Royal Antwerp

 Belgian Cup: 1991-92
 UEFA Cup Winners' Cup: 1992-93 (runners-up)

References 

1960 births
Living people
Belgian footballers
People from Zottegem
Association football central defenders
Royal Antwerp F.C. players
K.V. Kortrijk players
K.S.K. Ronse players
Footballers from East Flanders